Cybaeota is a genus of North American araneomorph spiders in the family Cybaeidae, and was first described by R. V. Chamberlin & Wilton Ivie in 1933. It was moved to the Cybaeidae in 1967.

Species
 it contains four species in the United States and Canada:
Cybaeota calcarata (Emerton, 1911) (type) – USA, Canada
Cybaeota munda Chamberlin & Ivie, 1937 – USA
Cybaeota nana Chamberlin & Ivie, 1937 – USA, Canada
Cybaeota shastae Chamberlin & Ivie, 1937 – USA

References

External links
Cybaeota at BugGuide

Araneomorphae genera
Cybaeidae
Spiders of North America